Airport Link or Airport Link line may refer to:

Airport Link, Brisbane, a tolled motorway and tunnel
Airport Link, Sydney, a commuter rail line in Sydney
Airport Link Company, a railway station operator in Sydney
Suvarnabhumi Airport Link, a railway line in Bangkok, Thailand
Airport Link, a portion of Sound Transit's Central Link in Seattle, Washington, United States
Airport Link (Ottawa), a light rail line under construction in Ottawa, Canada
Airport link line (Shanghai Suburban Railway), a commuter rail line under construction in Shanghai, China
AirportLink (Miami), a commuter rail line in Miami-Dade, Florida, United States

For a more general list of rail links to airports, see List of airport rail link systems.